The rivers of Georgia, a country in the Caucasus, are part of either the Black Sea or Caspian Sea Drainage basins.  The most spectacular rivers include the Alazani (longest river flowing through Georgia and Azerbaijan), Aragvi, Enguri (second longest river within Georgia), Kura (Mtkvari), and Rioni (longest river in Georgia) rivers.
 
Georgia has about 25,000 rivers, many of which power small hydroelectric stations. Drainage is into the Black Sea to the west and through Azerbaijan to the Caspian Sea to the east. The largest river is the Kura River, which flows 1,364 km from northeast Turkey across the plains of eastern Georgia, through the capital, Tbilisi, and into the Caspian Sea. The Rioni River, the largest river in western Georgia, rises in the Greater Caucasus and empties into the Black Sea at the port of Poti. Soviet engineers turned the river lowlands along the Black Sea coast into prime subtropical agricultural land, embanked and straightened many stretches of river, and built an extensive system of canals. Deep mountain gorges form topographical belts within the Greater Caucasus.

List of rivers 
The following table lists significant rivers that flow through Georgia. It shows the total length of the river, the length of the river within Georgia and other countries the river flows through, the size of the river's drainage basin, and the course of the river to the Caspian Sea or Black Sea.

Pictures of rivers

References 

 
 
 

Georgia (country)
Rivers